Mifflin Township is the name of some places in the U.S. state of Pennsylvania:

 Mifflin Township, Columbia County, Pennsylvania
 Mifflin Township, Dauphin County, Pennsylvania
 Mifflin Township, Lycoming County, Pennsylvania

See also 
 Fort Mifflin, on the Delaware River below Philadelphia, Pennsylvania
 Mifflin, Pennsylvania, a borough in Juniata County
 Mifflin County, Pennsylvania
 Lower Mifflin Township, Cumberland County, Pennsylvania
 Upper Mifflin Township, Cumberland County, Pennsylvania
 Mifflin (disambiguation)

Pennsylvania township disambiguation pages